A shape-up, also called a line-up or an edge-up, is a hairstyle that involves cutting along the natural hairline to straighten it. Edge-ups are typically found among men and short-haired women. The haircut grew in popularity during the 1980s, typically among those who have Afro-textured hair, and became the precursor to other stylish haircuts, such as the high-top fade, low fade, and designs such as crescent moon parts, side parts, and waves in hair.

The shape-up is influenced by hip-hop and pop culture and is common among entertainers and basketball players.

History

During the 1970s and the era of disco, most African-Americans sported an afro to reflect their cultural identity and their pride in their hair. In the 1980s, feeling that the afro looked dated, people began to cut their afros off in search of something new to go along with the new sounds of the decade. The shape-up was first introduced in the mid- or late 1980s. Influential hip-hop artists such as Eric B, Rakim, and Big Daddy Kane popularized the high-top fade with the shape-up.
With the arrival of the 1990s and the decline of the high-top fade, the demand for the shape-up remained. The low-top fade was the next adaptation to the shape-up's arsenal. This ushered in a new wave of options on how to be laced with an edge-up, including Caesar cuts with the grain and against the grain.

Equipment 

The shape-up is usually produced by an electric razor blade, though some barbers prefer to use a single hand razor blade for more precision. The electric razor is traced along the natural hairline to create a neat trim. The outcome is a clean and professional stylish look. The form of the shape-up could be rounded, but on most customers it is sleeker and sharper.

Popularity and influence
As the shape-up became more popular, so did the culture surrounding it. Men's visits to the barbershop became the venue for conversations about politics, sports, movies, personal life, and gossip. Movies and television shows depict this practice, such as rapper Ice Cube's production of the 2002 film Barbershop, a story of barbers and their shape-up clients.

See also
 List of hairstyles

References

External links

Hairstyles